Holophonic may refer to:

 Holophonics, a binaural recording system created by Hugo Zuccarelli
 Wave field synthesis, a spatial audio rendering technique, creating virtual acoustic environments